Greniodon is a genus of extinct gondwanatherian mammal known from the Early to Middle Eocene (Lutetian age, Mustersan to Divisaderan in the SALMA classification) of Argentina. A single species, Greniodon sylvaticus, is known, described in 2012 on the basis of two teeth found in the Andesitas Huancache Formation.

References 

Gondwanatheres
Prehistoric mammal genera
Eocene mammals of South America
Divisaderan
Mustersan
Paleogene Argentina
Fossils of Argentina
Fossil taxa described in 2012
Taxa named by Francisco J. Goin
Taxa named by Marcelo Tejedor
Taxa named by Laura Chornogubsky
Taxa named by Guillermo M. López
Taxa named by Javier N. Gelfo
Taxa named by Mariano Bond
Taxa named by Michael Woodburne
Taxa named by Yamila Gurovich
Taxa named by Marcelo Reguero